A pinnacle, tower, spire, needle or natural tower (Felsturm or Felszinne) in geology is an individual column of rock, isolated from other rocks or groups of rocks, in the shape of a vertical shaft or spire. 

Examples are the summits of the Aiguille du Midi in the Mont Blanc massif in France, the almost 43-metre-high Barbarine on the south side of the Pfaffenstein hill near Königstein in Germany, or the Bischofsmütze, the Drei Zinnen and the Vajolet Towers in the Dolomites, which are rich in such towers. An area of limestone formations within Nambung National Park, near the town of Cervantes, Western Australia, is known as The Pinnacles.

See also 
 Hoodoo
 Kigilyakh
 Pinnacles National Park
 Pyramidal peak
 Stack (geology)
 Totem pole (Monument Valley)
 Trango Towers

External links

Landforms